The Swimming competition at the 5th Pan American Games was held at the Pan Am Pool in Winnipeg, Manitoba, Canada, during the Games' run in 1967. It consisted of 29 long course (50m) events: 15 for males and 14 for females:

The 1967 Pan Ams marked several firsts for the Games:
It was the first time touch pads were used marking them to the hundredth-of-a-second (previous Games were to tenths-of-a-second only)
It was the first time the Individual Medleys were swum;
The 200 race distances for freestyle and backstroke were swum for the first time;
The 100 meter Breaststroke was swum for the first time. 
Uruguay won, for the first time, medals in swimming: there were 3, won by the country's women's swimming.
Puerto Rico also won, for the first time, a medal in swimming at the Pan American Games: a bronze in the women's 4 × 100 m free relay.

During the 1967 Pan Am Games in Winnipeg, 11 world records were beaten in swimming. It is the record of all editions of the championship, a record that will probably never be beaten.

Results

Men

Women

Medal table

References

 
1967
1967 Pan American Games
Pan American Games